D.N. Ace is a Canadian animated television series created by Matthew Wexler and produced by Nelvana. The show debuted on July 6, 2019 on Teletoon.

Plot
The series follows curious, adventure-loving, mischief-making, proudly nerdy, 12-year-old Ace Ripley who suddenly learns he holds an incredible ability to manipulate DNA by fusing the genes of a living thing with any other thing, to create something entirely new. The hero-in-the-making uses his newfound power to create ridiculous, amazing, and even terrifying mashed up creatures, and tries to save his town from total chaos while trying to have the time of his life.

Development
The series was announced on November 14, 2017, as a comedy adventure series created by Matthew Wexler and produced by Nelvana. Dentsu and OLM, Inc. served as consultants through production and represent the series in Japan. The show features service animation by Yeti Farm. Teletoon released the show's first trailer online on June 21, 2019.

Characters

Main
Ace Ripley (voiced by Lyon Smith) is the eponymous main character: a fun-loving 12-year-old who gains the power to manipulate DNA by using the Dscram, the DNA scrambling device that can create the Scrammers.

Sloane Plunderman (voiced by Samantha Weinstein) is Ace's best friend and the sister of Huxley Plunderman.

Mendel (voiced by Juan Chioran) is a talking 500 year old immortal squirrel who was the first animal mutated by the meteorite that fell on top of him. He has also sworn himself to be the guardian of the meteor from anyone with evil desires. With help from Ace's ancestor, Zebediah Ripley, he created the DNA scrambler.

Stuart Tweeble (voiced by Rob Tinkler) is Ace's older stepbrother. Step Stu's dad married Ace's mom.

Huxley Plunderman (voiced by Taylor Abrahamse) The main villain of season 1, CEO of Plunderman Enterprises and the evil brother of Sloane. He is later downgraded to a recurring antagonist when he fires the scientist Juan and becomes target to some of his attacks.

Other/Minor/Supporting
Huxley's Scientists Head engineers who work for Huxley to build Clashbots.

Scientist 1#/Juan; Tall red head male. In "Del Contender", Huxley fires him and Juan joined Ace and his team. He soon betrays Ace because he was actually spying for Huxley. After the event of Ace and his team to retrieve the rod that destroyed Crabby, Huxley fires Juan, for real this time, making him became a new enemy to Ace when it revealed that Juan has been studying Ace and the Scrammers, knowing that they are not robots from the start. He intended to collect three meteor splinters to power up his robot armor.

Scientist #2; Purple-haired African-Canadian woman.

Scientist #3; Overweight male with sage-colored hair.

All three of them wear red sunglasses, white coats, and black clothes. They also act as "The World's Clashbots League Council Of Elders" when they are wearing robes and amulets.

Bruiser Huxley's main robot. A rag doll Frankenstein's Monster like robot with a monstrous attitude with a human-like speaking voice. In the episode "Splinterfell", it revealed that he had a meteor splinter inside of him. His true form resembles more of a common Clashbot that has his original color design.

Countess Of Clash A clash coach champion that lives on Clash Mountain with her giant robotic pig. She has crazy eyes. She disguises herself as Steve, a crazy old man.

Cynthia E. Overdrive/C.E.O A businesswoman who owns vending machine-type clash bots. She speaks in a snotty Valley-girl accent.

Cackles The Clown A psychotic clash coach clown that terrorizes and destroys cities if his challengers won't accept his challenge. He makes a 2nd appearance in "Crooks and Grannies".

Rad Maverick A suffer-type clash coach who lives in the sewers.

Mendor Mendel's twin brother. Mendor is opposite to his brother, he's more fun, more adventurous, and more greedy. He hides his evil twin brother act so he can trick Ace and Sloane, plus the Scrammers, to convince them he's more chilled and lovable.

Clashsquatch A sentient previous clashbot champion that gain intelligence by a small version of the super meteorite.

Captain Nuevo The recent Clash Coach champion.

Warhol Muse An industrialist magician clash coach. He is shown to have a southern accent dialogue and seem to be insane. He has a WM logo on his giant hat and tie. In the episode "Now Museum Now You Don't" he touch a splinter statue of Mendel and gain powers to turn anyone into paintings, float and glow orange. Thankfully it wasn't permanent, only keeping it inside his hat allows him to have powers.

Mr.Preston/Mr.P a.k.a. The Dump King A nice and kind garbage man that been corrupted and turned evil by drinking essence of the exiled Scarrathorn.

Granny Ace's grandma (and Stew's step grandma). Originally a sweet grandmother before her arrival. After she went on a Gluten free diet, she became more reckless, destructive, obnoxious and crazier than her own grandson.

Ace's Mom Ace's mother (and Stew's Stepmom) shares resemblance to her son.

Stew's Dad Stew's father (and Ace's Stepdad) shares resemblance to his son.

Jerry Dayzee (Voiced by Rob Tinkler) A salesman who is barely respected.

Butternut A Christmas elf that came over from the North Pole to Del Lago. He befriended Ace, Sloan, Mendel and the Scrammers. He was kidnapped by Huxley and forced him to make clashbots to rule the city. He told the team that Santa has been monitoring the super meteorite from a satellite for 100 years since its arrival.

Tim Butternut's reindeer friend. Tim gains powers from jumping onto the super meteorite which gave him the abilities to fly, create portals and shoot laser beams from his antlers.

Raj Dynamite A clash coach who lost in a clash fight and wasn't seen for a year. Until he returns in the Clash Of The Titans Tournament when he created a cloning device, The Clonezooka, to enter the Titan Tournament. It was revealed he was after the belt not just for the title but because there was a Meteor Splinter on the belt.

Lucy also called Little Lucy. A little girl who used to be Ace's biggest fan, until Ace starts to miss out the Clash Tournaments while he is busy with fighting Juan and his Juander-bots. Ace is aware of Lucy before fighting Juan, including having spare time hanging out with her, until he forgot about her. She use a Combiner-Bot to fight off Ace and his Scrammers.

Eel Mutant A normal eel that been mutated by a Splinter underwater and turn into a giant angler fish and dragonfish hybrid-like monster. It had the power to absorb the energy of the Scrammer's attacks. When the splinter was removed, it returns to a normal eel.

Feral Plasma A bacteria that been mutated from feeding on Splinters for centuries and turn into a lava monster. It can drain the Splinter's energy.

Clashbots/Clashers Small Robots that are a popular brand for people and are use in the Clash-a-torium to compete in tournaments and games.
 Common Clashbots
 Security-Bot
 Unicycle-Bot
 Party-Bot
 Ice Cream-Bot
 Lumber Jack-Bot
 Mega-Clasher/Dragon-Bot/Flap Dragon A robot dragon.
 Servant-Bots
 Combiner-Bots Five Clashbots merge into one.
 Combo-Bot A robot that was built to destroy the Scrammers.
 Jolly-Bots
 Dragon-Bot 2/Flap Dragon 2. A smaller version of the original Dragon-Bot.
 Royal-Bot. Juan's little robot butler.
 Juander-Bots.
 Ninja Juander-Bots.

Scrammers
Creatures that Ace creates with the Dscram using DNA mix of one living being and one object. The Scrammers also have their own unique powers and their own personalities when created. But all of them are very loyal to their creator Ace. All of them are about 2 feet tall.

Multi Crab/Crabby Half Crab half multi-tool.
Snout Hammer Half Boar half hammer.
Hide-And-Sneak/Heidi (voiced by Evany Rosen) Half Chameleon half High top shoes.
Digby/Digs (voiced by David Berni) Half Groundhog half Whoopee cushion.
Cobra Tot Half Snake half Baby doll.
Boom Hound Half Bull Terrier half Boombox.
Chopper Half Beaver half Pine cone.
Sharkuum Half Shark half Vacuum cleaner.
Cluck-Cluck-Boom/C.C. Half chicken half "Blueberry Pancake Cannon" Paint Ball Gun.
Hose Fly Half Moth half Fire Extinguisher
Rachael 2 (voiced by Angela Maiorano-Thurston) Half Raccoon half Finger Puppet Rachael.
The Great Bivalvo/val Half oyster half fortune cookie
Cucarocka  (voiced by Mac Heywood) Half cockroach half voice box thingy
Chlorofile/Chlo  Half Ivy Half Nail File.
Elasta-Kitty Half Cat half Rubberband.
Snot Rocket Half snot and germs half toy tank.
Head Wig Half sloth half helmet.
Beef Plungington Half cow half plunger.
Scarrathorn Half Biological Mutated Venus Fly Trap half body spray.
Night Leaper (voiced by Andrew Jackson) Half Grasshopper half Action Figure.
Polly Roger Half Parrot half GPS.
Rhinestone Half Rhino Half Diamond.
Bear-B-Que Half Bear Half Grill Cooker.
Monkey Floss/Mo Half Monkey Half Cotton Candy.
Sammy-Rye Half Scorpion Half Sandwich.
Spark Bug Half Firefly Half Headphones.
Razzle Dazzle Half Peacock Half Glow Stick.
Sir Quills Half Porcupine Half Knight's Helmet.
OctoGraph Half Lie Detector Half Octopus.
Bucky BlowTorch Half Rabbit Half Torch.
Tooleo Half Toolbox Half Carpenter Ant.
Lazerine Half Wolverine Half Lazer.
Arachnotist/Ari Half Spider Half 3D Printer.
Power Wash/PDubs Half Mosquito Half Sponge.
Frostbite Half Crocodile Half Freezer.
Solar Ray Half Sunflower Half Microwave
CompuFox Half Fox Half Computer

Episodes

References

External links
 

2010s Canadian animated television series
2010s Canadian comic science fiction television series
2020s Canadian animated television series
2020s Canadian comic science fiction television series
2019 Canadian television series debuts
2020 Canadian television series endings
Canadian children's animated action television series
Canadian children's animated adventure television series
Canadian children's animated comic science fiction television series
Canadian children's animated science fantasy television series
Anime-influenced Western animated television series
English-language television shows
Teletoon original programming
Television series by Nelvana
Animated television series about children
Animated television series about squirrels